Gregor Hayter (born 13 August 1976 in Scotland) is a Scottish former rugby union player who played for Glasgow Warriors at the Lock position. He also previously played for Caledonia Reds and Edinburgh Rugby.

He also spent five years in Italy playing for Crociati Parma Rugby FC and Rugby Viadana.

He also played for Newbury, Rotherham Titans and played and coached Sheffield Tigers.

He played for England Counties XV and Scotland at age grade.

He now works as an Electrical Technician.

References

External links 

Gregor Hayter signs for Glasgow

1976 births
Alumni of the University of Dundee
Living people
Glasgow Warriors players
Scottish rugby union players
Rugby Viadana players
Watsonians RFC players
Caledonia Reds players
Dundee HSFP players
Edinburgh Rugby players
Stirling County RFC players
Rugby union locks